Lopa consists of a pair of minor Kainji languages of Nigeria. The Lopa people neighbouring the Busa language have shifted to that language.

The two languages are Rop (Ollop) and Urcibar (Shuba). Additionally, there is a native name for both dialects as a whole: Rerang, which is unusual in West Kainji languages.

Blench (2019) lists Tsupamini as a related variety.

McGill (2012) also gives the alternate name Oleran for Lopa.

Dialects
The name Lopa likely comes from the name lópár (Lapar), which refers to both the Rop and the Shuba. Cover terms referring to both Urcibar and Ollop speakers are [dɔ̀ɾìɾáŋ̃ ] (one person), [òːɾìɾáŋ̃ ] (many people), and the language [òlːèɾáŋ̃].

Urcibar (Shuba) is spoken in the major villages of ò̃tʃébá (Cifamini), tʷò̃tʃíɡí (Gungun Tagwaye), ò̃sán (Kwanga, different from ò̃sán above); and the minor villages of àjũ ́̃m (Yumu), àːʔʲɔ́ (Bakari), ámbú (Ambu shiri). Urcibar is actually more closely related to Shen (Laru) than to Rop.

Ollop (Rop) is spoken in the major villages of àɾóp (Lopa town), ù̃jẽ ́mé (Gafara), rʷáːʃé (Raishe); and the minor villages of ʔʷéːɾà (Tungan Masu), ò̃sán (Bakin Ruwa), lópár (Lapar), áñ wá ̃ (Ana). Lopa speakers call  themselves [dɔ̀ɾóp] (one person), [òːɾɔ́p] (many people), and the language [òlːɔ́p]. They refer to Urcibar speakers as [dɔ̀tʃíbár] (one person), [òːtʃíbár] (many people), and to their language as [ɘ̀ɹtʃíbár].

References

Kainji languages
Languages of Nigeria